Chhata  Assembly constituency is one  of the 403 constituencies of the Uttar Pradesh Legislative Assembly,  India. It is a part of the Mathura district and one  of the five assembly constituencies in the Mathura Lok Sabha constituency. First election in this assembly constituency was held in 1952 after the "DPACO (1951)" (delimitation order) was passed in 1951. After the "Delimitation of Parliamentary and Assembly Constituencies Order" was passed in 2008, the constituency was assigned identification number 81.

Wards  / Areas
Extent  of Chhata Assembly constituency is KCs Kosi Kalan, Nandgaon, Chaumuhan, PCs  Hatana, Kharant, Falain-I, Guheta, Viswa, Paigaon, Chandauri, Nagla Hasnur,  Baraka, Bukhrari, Ainch, Shahpur, Dhanauta, Roop Nagar, Sher Nagar,  Majhoi, Barchawali, Bishambhara of Paigaon KC, PCs Dautana, Bhadawal,  Bajna, Chintagarhi, Chhata-I, Chhata-II, Khanpur, Sankhi, Ranwari, Ajnothi, Ladpur, Bahrawali,  Agrayala, Baheta, Kajrouth, Syaraha of Chhata KC, Kosi Kalan MB, Chhata NP,  Chaumuhan NP, Nandgaon NP & Barsana NP of Chhata Tehsil.

Members of the Legislative Assembly

Election results

2022

2012

See also

Mathura district
Mathura Lok Sabha constituency
Sixteenth Legislative Assembly of Uttar Pradesh
Uttar Pradesh Legislative Assembly

References

External links
 

Assembly constituencies of Uttar Pradesh
Mathura district
Constituencies established in 1951